Ficus variegata may refer to:
 Ficus variegata (plant), a species of tropical fig tree
 Ficus variegata (gastropod), a species of sea snail